Alchemy is the twelfth studio album by guitarist Yngwie Malmsteen, released on 23 November 1999 through Pony Canyon (Japan) and Spitfire Records (United States).

Track listing

Bonus track (Japanese edition)

Personnel
Yngwie J. Malmsteen – lead guitars, rhythm guitars, acoustic guitars, guitar synthesizer, bass, Moog Taurus pedals, sitar and vocals
Mark Boals – vocals
Barry Dunaway – bass
John Macaluso – drums
Mats Olausson – keyboards, backing vocals
Rich DiSilvio – cover art and package design

References

1999 albums
Yngwie Malmsteen albums